C. Madhava Reddy (22 August 1924 – 14 March 1990) was an Indian politician who was a Member of Parliament, serving in the 1st and 8th Lok Sabhas. Reddy represented the Adilabad constituency of Andhra Pradesh and is a member of the Telugu Desam Party political party.

Early life and education
C. Madhava Reddy was born in the village Arepelli, Chinnoor, Adilabad in the state of Andhra Pradesh. He attended the Osmania University and attained M.A degree. By profession, Reddy is an Agriculturist.

Political career
C. Madhava Reddy was the first elected M.P from Adilabad constituency. He also was a member of Andhra Pradesh Legislative Assembly in 1962. Reddy got re-elected as M.P in the 8th Lok Sabha of India.

During his entire political career, Reddy associated with several political parties; viz Socialist Party, Praja Socialist Party, Indian National Congress, Janata Party and is currently a member of the Telugu Desam Party.

Death
Reddy died from complications of by-pass surgery in Madras, on 14 March 1990, at the age of 65.

Posts Held

See also
Andhra Pradesh Legislative Assembly
Parliament of India
Politics of India

References

1924 births
1990 deaths
India MPs 1952–1957
India MPs 1984–1989
Indian National Congress politicians from Andhra Pradesh
Lok Sabha members from Andhra Pradesh
People from Adilabad
Telugu Desam Party politicians
Praja Socialist Party politicians
Janata Party politicians
Telugu politicians